Warsaw is a home rule-class city in and the county seat of Gallatin County, Kentucky, United States, located along the Ohio River. The name was suggested by a riverboat captain, who was reading Thaddeus of Warsaw, by Jane Porter, when the city was being founded.

The city had a population of 1,615 at the 2010 census, down from 1,811 at the 2000 census.

History
Warsaw began as a landing on the Ohio River in 1798 called "Great Landing". In 1805, founder Colonel Robert Johnson surveyed and built a road from this landing to his former home in Scott County, Kentucky. The landing soon became a busy shipping port.

In 1814, Colonel Johnson and Henry Yates purchased  to establish a river town to be named "Fredericksburg", after Johnson's hometown in Virginia. By 1815, the town plot was complete. The town extended from the river to Market Street and included 172 numbered lots, each .

In 1831, the town was renamed as "Warsaw", as the US Postal Service did not want it to have the same name as the Virginia city. The post office was established July 18, 1832, with  W.F. Clinton as postmaster. In 1837, the Gallatin County seat was moved from Port William (now Carrollton) to Warsaw. The courthouse is now the oldest operating one in the state. The oldest home in Warsaw is the Henry Yates House, a home built of log construction circa 1809.

On December 4, 1868, 80 people died in the Ohio River steamboat collision of the United States and the America near Warsaw.

The Warsaw Historic District was listed on the National Register of Historic Places in 1982. It is roughly bounded by W. High, E. Franklin, Washington, Market, Main, 3rd, 4th and Cross streets. It features Italianate and Gothic Revival architecture.

Geography
Warsaw is located in north-central Gallatin County, along the south bank of the Ohio River. Across the river is the unincorporated community of Florence, Indiana; the closest river crossing is the Markland Dam Bridge,  to the west (downstream). U.S. Route 42 passes through the center of town, leading northeast  to Covington and southwest along the Ohio River  to Carrollton. Kentucky Route 35 leads south from Warsaw  to Interstate 71 and the Kentucky Speedway in Sparta.

Demographics

As of the census of 2000, there were 1,811 people, 737 households, and 451 families residing in the city. The racial makeup of the city was 92.88% white, 4.86% African American, 0.11% Native American, 0.50% Asian, 0.39% from other races, and 1.27% from two or more races. Hispanic or Latino of any race were 1.27% of the population.

There were 737 households, out of which 30.8% had children under the age of 18 living with them, 40.2% were married couples living together, 14.9% had a female householder with no husband present, and 38.7% were non-families. 33.6% of all households were made up of individuals, and 16.6% had someone living alone who was 65 years of age or older. The average household size was 2.31 and the average family size was 2.93.

In the city, the population was spread out, with 25.1% under the age of 18, 8.4% from 18 to 24, 27.8% from 25 to 44, 19.4% from 45 to 64, and 19.3% who were 65 years of age or older. The median age was 37 years. For every 100 females, there were 92.0 males. For every 100 females age 18 and over, there were 84.0 males.

The median income for a household in the city was $25,179, and the median income for a family was $31,250. Males had a median income of $30,174 versus $18,164 for females. The per capita income for the city was $15,340. About 16.8% of families and 20.3% of the population were below the poverty line, including 23.7% of those under age 18 and 16.6% of those age 65 or over.

Education
Public education in Warsaw is administered by Gallatin County Schools, which operates Gallatin County High School.

Warsaw has a lending library, the Gallatin County Public Library.

Notable people
Richard Yates was born in 1815 in Warsaw and lived there until about age 16. His family moved to Illinois in 1831. He subsequently studied law at Transylvania University in Kentucky. After moving to Illinois, he became a politician, serving at the state and federal level, and as governor of Illinois.
In 1844, Carlotta Thompkins was born to a wealthy plantation owner and his wife in Warsaw. Her father, an ardent gambler, taught her the art of gaming from a very young age. In her early adulthood Thompkins traveled the Mississippi River looking for gambling opportunities. She later settled in Texas, becoming one of the most well-known gamblers in the Old West.
Lucy Montz was the first woman in Kentucky to practice dentistry. The Dr. Lucy Dupuy Montz House was listed on the National Register of Historic Places in 1978.
Eva Craig Graves Doughty, journalist.

See also

 List of cities and towns along the Ohio River
 Lynchings of Benjamin and Mollie French

References

External links

 City of Warsaw official website
 Northern Kentucky Views
 KY GenWeb Gallatin County Kentucky History & Genealogy, a Repository Collection site

Cities in Gallatin County, Kentucky
Cities in Kentucky
Kentucky populated places on the Ohio River
County seats in Kentucky
1798 establishments in Kentucky